This was the first edition of the tournament, Taylor Fritz won the title beating Dustin Brown in the final 6–3, 6–4.

Seeds

Draw

Finals

Top half

Bottom half

References
 Main Draw
 Qualifying Draw

Fairfield Challenger - Singles
Fairfield Challenger